Giulia Gatto-Monticone and Anastasia Grymalska were the defending champions but chose not to participate.

Asia Muhammad and Storm Sanders won the title, defeating Naiktha Bains and Tereza Mihalíková in the final, 6–3, 6–4.

Seeds

Draw

Draw

References

External Links
Main Draw

City of Playford Tennis International II - Doubles